Enrique Carlos Serje Orozco (born 10 January 1996) is a Colombian professional footballer who plays as a defensive midfielder for Atlético Junior.

Career statistics

1 Includes Categoría Primera B and Categoría Primera A matches.  2 Includes Copa Colombia matches only.  3 Includes Copa Sudamericana matches only.

References

External links

1996 births
Living people
Colombian footballers
Barranquilla F.C. footballers
Atlético Junior footballers
Once Caldas footballers
Independiente Santa Fe footballers
Categoría Primera A players
Categoría Primera B players
Association football midfielders
People from Atlántico Department